The habenular commissure, is a brain commissure (a band of nerve fibers) situated in front of the pineal gland that connects the habenular nuclei on both sides of the diencephalon.

The habenular commissure is part of the habenular trigone (a small depressed triangular area situated in front of the superior colliculus and on the lateral aspect of the posterior part of the tænia thalami). The trigonum habenulæ also contains groups of nerve cells termed the ganglion habenulæ. Fibers enter the trigonum habenulæ from the stalk of the pineal gland, and the habenular commissure. Most of the trigonum habenulæ's fibers are, however, directed downward and form a bundle, the fasciculus retroflexus of Meynert, which passes medial to the red nucleus, and, after decussating with the corresponding fasciculus of the opposite side, ends in the interpeduncular nucleus.

External links
 NIF Search - Habenular commissure via the Neuroscience Information Framework

Habenula